Adenylyl cyclase type 5 is an enzyme that in humans is encoded by the ADCY5 gene.

Interactions 

ADCY5 has been shown to interact with RGS2.

References

External links

Further reading 

 
 
 
 
 
 
 
 
 
 
 
 
 
 
 
 
 
 

EC 4.6.1